The fifth generation of the Ford F-Series is a line of pickup trucks and commercial trucks that were produced by Ford from the 1967 to 1972 model years.  Built on the same platform as the fourth generation F-series trucks, the fifth generation had sharper styling lines, a larger cab, and expanded engine options.

Three trim levels were available during the production of the fifth generation F-series, though the names were changed in 1970.  The "Base" trim became the "Custom" and the "Custom Cab" became the "Sport Custom" joining "Ranger" as optional levels of equipment and trim.  Late in production the Ranger trim level was upgraded with the additional "Ranger XLT" option.

Year by year changes
1967: Introduction of fifth-generation F-Series in 1966 for the 1967 model year.  Cab is  wider than predecessor and frame is heavier.  Grille, exterior trim, interior cab fittings and engine choices are unique to this year.  Trim levels are "Base", "Custom Cab", and "Ranger".
1968: As federal regulations required all automotive manufacturers to install side marker reflectors or lights, Ford redesigned the hood emblems to incorporate reflectors as well as added reflectors to the rear of the bed. Interior fittings changed due to new safety standards. New versions of the FE-Series engine added (360 truck and 390). First year of factory-installed air conditioning (air conditioning was installed by the dealer before 1968).
1969: New grille design, new 302 Windsor V8 engine option.
1970: Mid-cycle update with many detail changes including a completely new grille including wraparound front turn signals, exterior trim changes, and new side marker lights. "Sport Custom" trim replaces "Custom Cab", and "Ranger XLT" added as top trim level.

Argentina
A new engine choice to the local market is introduced in that year: the diesel engine, which was a Perkins 3.3 L (203 cu in) l4 engine with 120 hp SAE at 3,000 RPM.
Also, another change is the alternator, replacing the dynamo.

Mexico
The new 335 cu in (5.4 L) V8 engine was introduced as a new engine option, only in medium duty trucks. This engine was designed by Mexican Ford engineers and was relative of the Windsor family and was based in the 351 and 302 ones, with a stronger crankshaft and elongated stroke. The 335 had a Holley 2-barrel carburetor and had an output of 200 hp at 4,000 RPM. This engine co-existed with the 289 cu in V8 up to 1972.
1971: New grille inserts, steering wheel design, and colors.  AM/FM radios are added as an option.
1972: Final year of production (in North America). Minor detail changes and power brakes become a new option on upper level trim options.

Special models

After 1968, Ford discontinued the "Low GVWR" versions. Still available was the Camper Special option (heavy duty cooling, camper pre-wiring, and larger alternator) along with the new Explorer Special (a limited edition trim and option package that combined many of the "Ranger" trim pieces with a lower overall price), Contractor's Special (including a behind the seat toolbox and 3/4 ton (F-250) suspension), Farm and Ranch Special (extra toolboxes and heavy springs), and Heavy-Duty Special (extra hauling abilities). These special models had various levels of options factory installed to appeal to different target groups.

Argentina
The fifth-generation F-Series was introduced in Argentina in 1968, where it remained in production until circa 1973.
Was made in the following models: F-100, F-350 the medium duty truck F-600 and the F-700.
It remained almost on par with the US range, without major chronological mismatches, in terms of the renewal of the range.
The local make Igarreta, provides some interesting versions with custom configurations for private companies and also for the Argentine State.

Brazil

The fifth-generation F-Series was introduced in Brazil in 1972, where it remained in production until circa 1992. It received a series of changes and updates over the two decades of production, eventually being fitted with a 4-cylinder MWM 3.9 liter Diesel engine available in both naturally-aspirated (D229-4) and turbocharged versions (TD229-4) in a local equivalent to the F-250 badged as F-1000, also available with a 6-cylinder 3.4 liter engine both in gasoline and dedicated-ethanol versions, while the F-100 retained the gasoline-powered Y-Block 272 V8 and the Georgia OHC 2.3L 4-cyl in both gasoline and dedicated-ethanol versions. It was the last Ford truck manufactured in the Ipiranga plant which closed soon after the truck's discontinuation. Brazilian F-100 and F-1000 were only available with a single cab and 2-wheel drive, but a number of local specialists custom-built double cabs, and Engesa provided an aftermarket 4-wheel drive conversion.

Canada 
In Canada, the Explorer Special was a trim level that sat between the base model truck and Custom Cab. It used the Custom Cab trim and grille but didn't include things like a radio.

Models
 F-100: 1/2 ton (5,500 GVWR max)
 F-100: 1/2 ton (4x4) (5,600 GVWR max)
 F-250: 3/4 ton (up to 8,100 GVWR max)
 F-250: 3/4 ton (4×4) (8,200 GVWR max)
 F-350: 1 ton (up to 10,000 GVWR max)  Dual rear wheels available

Bed options 
Styleside on F-100 and F-250.  6.5' and 8' lengths.

Flareside on all models, 6.5', 8' and 9' (F-350 only) lengths.

Platform stakes on F-250 and F-350 in 9' and 12' lengths.

Cab options 
Standard cab on all models.

Crew cab with seating for six and four doors optional on F-250 and F-350.

Engines

NOTE: HP ratings sourced from original Ford truck dealer brochures and 1967 Mercury/Ford Truck owners manual (170 CID)

Medium-Duty F-series
The heavier duty models (F-500 and up) continued to be built on the fifth generation chassis even after the lighter-duty models were replaced. In 1977, the lightest F-500 was discontinued, leaving the F-600 as the lightest of the medium-duties. It was built until the introduction of the seventh generation F-series in late 1979.

References

5th generation
Pickup trucks
Rear-wheel-drive vehicles
All-wheel-drive vehicles
Cars introduced in 1966
1970s cars
Motor vehicles manufactured in the United States